Machaneng Airport  is a military airstrip on the northeast side of Machaneng, a town in the Central District of Botswana.

See also

Transport in Botswana
List of airports in Botswana

References

External links 
OpenStreetMap - Machaneng
OurAirports - Machaneng
Fallingrain - Machaneng Airport

Airports in Botswana